The Night Is Still Young may refer to:

 "The Night Is Still Young" (Billy Joel song)
 "The Night Is Still Young" (Nicki Minaj song)
 "The Night Is Still Young" (Sandra song), featuring Thomas Anders
 "The Night Is Still Young" (Sha Na Na album)